This is a list of blues festivals in Canada. These festivals—which celebrate Canadian blues music, and often times roots music as well—range from small, community-based festivals that feature mostly local performers, to major corporate-sponsored festivals that draw nationally and internationally-prominent blues musicians.

Some of the larger festivals in Canada include the Ottawa Bluesfest, Bluesfest Windsor, the Harvest Jazz & Blues Festival in Fredericton, Tremblant International Blues Festival in Mont-Tremblant, and the Edmonton's Labatt Blues Festival. These festivals, which are usually organized by volunteer-based blues societies, are an important part of the Canadian blues scene.

List

British Columbia

 Burnaby Blues + Roots Festival — August in Burnaby
 Harbour Blues 'N Roots Festival (formerly Vancouver Island Blues Bash) — Labour Day weekend in Victoria
 Hornby Island Blues Workshop — May in Hornby Island
 Pender Harbour Blues Festival — early June in Pender Harbour
 Salmon Arm Roots and Blues Festival — August in Salmon Arm, in B.C. Interior
 Summertime Blues Festival — August in Nanaimo

Alberta
 Beaumont Blues & Roots Festival — June (previously Labour Day weekend) in Beaumont
 Calgary International Blues Festival — summer in Calgary
 Calgary Midwinter Bluesfest — February in Calgary
 Edmonton Blues Festival — August in Edmonton

Saskatchewan
 Regina Blues Association’s Mid-Winter Blues Festival — in Regina
 Saskatoon Blues Festival — end of February in Saskatchewan

Manitoba
 Great Woods Music Festival — August in Beausejour
 Winnipeg BBQ & Blues Festival — August in Winnipeg

Ontario
 Atomic Blues Fest — in Lindsay
 Aurora Winter Blues Festival — in Aurora
 Barrie Jazz and Blues Festival — June (2nd weekend) in Barrie
 The February Blues — February in Barrie
 Bluesfest International — July in Windsor and London
 Bluesfest Windsor — July in Windsor
 Boon's House Blues & Roots Festival — July in Hamilton
 Burlington Jazz & Blues Festival — July in Burlington
 Calabogie Blues & Ribfest — August in Calabogie
 Canal Bank Shuffle — October in Thorold
 Capitol Centre's Bluesfest — in North Bay
 Coal Flats Blues Festival — September in Port Burwell
 Escarpment Blues Festival — mid-July in Milton
 Kitchener Blues Festival — August in Kitchener
 Limestone City Blues Festival — late August in Kingston
 London Blues Festival — August in London
 Mudcat Blues Fest — August in Dunnville
 Orangeville Blues and Jazz Festival — first weekend of June in Orangeville
 Orillia Spring Blues Festival — Orillia
 Oshawa Jazz and Blues Festival — August in Oshawa
 Ottawa Bluesfest — July in Ottawa
 Paisley Blues Fest — June (1st weekend) in Paisley, Ontario
 Porquis Blues Festival — early July in Porquis
 Port Credit Blues and Jazz Festival (also called the "Southside Shuffle") — early September in Port Credit, Mississauga
 Stratford Blues and Ribfest — June in Stratford
 Thunder Bay Blues Festival — July in Thunder Bay
 Twisted Pines Blues Festival — May in the Midland/Penetanguishene area
 Wasaga Beach Blues — September in Wasaga Beach
 Winterfolk Blues & Roots Festival — in Toronto
 Women in the Wilds Blues Festival — September in Atikokan, Northwestern Ontario

Quebec
  — April in Chicoutimi
 West Island Blues Festival — June in Pierrefonds/Roxboro, Island of Montreal
 Montreal International Jazz Festival (Blues Stage) — June in Montreal
 Tremblant International Blues Festival — July in Mont-Tremblant
 Sherblues & Folk — July in Sherbrooke
  — August in Saint-Laurent-de-l'Île-d'Orléans
  — August in Saint-Sauveur
 Festival de Blues de Donnacona — August in Donnacona
 Trois-Rivières en Blues — August in Trois-Rivières
 Festival de Blues de Joliette — October in Joliette

Atlantic Canada 
 Dutch Mason Blues Festival — August in Truro, Nova Scotia
 Harvest Jazz & Blues Festival — September in Fredericton, New Brunswick
 Wreckhouse International Jazz & Blues Festival — early July in St. John's, Newfoundland and Labrador
 Blues d'la Baie — July (3rd weekend) in Petit-Rocher, New Brunswick

References

and
Blues
Blues
Canada
Blues